Maneed  is a village/ rurban area in Ernakulam district in the Indian state of Kerala.

Demographics
 India census, Maneed had a population of 16456 with 8196 males and 8260 females.
Nearest town Piravom
Nearest city Kochi

Major attractions
Govt LP School
Govt High School
Govt Hospital
Maneed village Office
Maneed Panchayath
Nechoor Kavala
Maneed Palli (previously Kiliamangalath Church)
Sree Narayana Temple Maneed
Nechoor Palli (200 yrs old)
Madakkil Kavu
Moovattupuza River
YMCA hall, YMCA junction
Mini civil station Anamunthi
Kiliamangalath building Anamunthi(100 years old)
Maneed Puncha scattered over 1000 ha of land
 Insight Media City (Flowers Channel Studio)
First ever Rubber plantation started in Ernakulam District is in Maneed By Planter V.M. Peter Kolleenal, he planted the rubber about   90 years back. ST. Thomas Rubber estate started near to Anamunthi junction now known as Gandhi Square.

References

Villages in Ernakulam district